Type 1 or Type I or variant, may refer to:

Health
Diabetes mellitus type 1 (also known as "Type 1 Diabetes"), insulin-dependent diabetes
Type I female genital mutilation
Type 1 personality
Type I hypersensitivity (or immediate hypersensitivity), an allergic reaction

Vehicles
Type 1 diesel locomotives

Civilian automotive
US F1 Type 1, 2010 F1 Car
Bugatti Type 1, an automobile
Peugeot Type 1, 1890s vis-a-vis
Volkswagen Type 1, an automobile commonly known as the Volkswagen Beetle

Military
German Type I submarine
Type 001 aircraft carrier, PLAN carrier class variant of the Soviet Kuznetsov class
Nakajima Ki-43, officially designated Army Type 1 Fighter

Japanese armoured vehicles of World War II
Type 1 Chi-He, a tank
Type 1 Ho-Ni I, a tank
Type 1 Ho-Ha, an armoured personnel carrier
Type 1 Ho-Ki, an armoured personnel carrier

Weapons
Type 1 37 mm Anti-Tank Gun, a Japanese weapon
Type 1 47 mm Anti-Tank Gun, a Japanese weapon
Type 01 LMAT, a Japanese fire-and-forget anti-tank missile
Type 1 heavy machine gun, a Japanese weapon
Type 1 machine gun, a Japanese weapon
Type I Rifle, Arisaka; a Japanese combat rifle

Other uses
Type I and type II errors used in statistics
Type 1 encryption, a cryptographical certification
Type 1 fonts
Type-1 Gumbel distribution, a distribution function
Type I lattice
Type 1 sequence
Type I plug/socket, known formally as AS 3112, an Australian standard for mains power plugs
Type 1 electrical connector, used by electric vehicles
Type I superconductor
Type I string theory
Type I Transmembrane Protein
 Type I, part of the Kardashev scale of measuring a civilization's technology level
 IEC Type I, one of the four "type" classifications of audio cassette formulation
MOT Type 1 Stone, a UK specification for aggregate used as a sub-base in the construction of driveways and roads.

See also

 
 
 
 
 L type (disambiguation) or "type-l"
 Type (disambiguation)
 1 (disambiguation)